Synod of Diospolis was a 415 synod in Diospolis (now Lod, Israel) in which Pelagius was accused of heresy by the exiled Gallic bishops Heros of Arles and Lazarus of Aix, who were not present. It was summoned by Eulogius, bishop of Caesarea and included thirteen other bishops. Pelagius defended himself by disavowing the doctrines of Caelestius and was not convicted. Fragments of the synod's proceedings are preserved in Augustine's work On The Proceedings Of Pelagius.

Sources

External links
Synod according to Augustine

415
Lod
Pelagianism
5th-century church councils